Ross Haven is a summer village in Alberta, Canada. It is located on the northern shore of Lac Ste. Anne, south of Highway 43.

Demographics 

In the 2016 Census of Population conducted by Statistics Canada, the Summer Village of Ross Haven had a population of 160 living in 64 of its 215 total private dwellings, a  change from its 2011 population of 137.

See also 
List of communities in Alberta
List of summer villages in Alberta
List of resort villages in Saskatchewan

References

External links 

1962 establishments in Alberta
Lac Ste. Anne County
Summer villages in Alberta